The 1973 Medal of Honor Firecracker 400 was a NASCAR Winston Cup Series race that took place on July 4, 1973, at Daytona International Speedway in Daytona Beach, Florida.

This race - and the 1969 and 1971 runnings of this race - was actually called the "Medal of Honor Firecracker 400", in an effort to honor Congressional Medal of Honor winners.

Race report
This was the first race with new rules regarding carburetor restrictors. It was widely assumed that these ruled helped volume production wedge engines, especially that used by Chevrolet.

This race eventually became Marty Robbins' most iconic race during his career in NASCAR. While he would start in 36th place (out of the 40 drivers who made up the racing grid), he would finish the race in eighth place, seven laps down. J.D. McDuffie ended up being the last-place finisher of this race due to an engine problem on lap 2 of 160. It took more than 160 minutes and two caution flags for David Pearson to defeat Richard Petty in front of sixty thousand fans. Six car lengths was the distance between Petty and Pearson. Bobby Allison secured the pole position at  during qualifying.

The race averaged . Engine problems took numerous other drivers out of the race. All competitors (except for Canadian-born Vic Parsons) were born in the United States. Mercury, Dodge, and Chevrolet made up the majority of the grid. Bobby Allison, Cale Yarborough, Richard Petty and David Pearson were the only lap leaders. The Chevrolet vehicles dominated the race, but after Yarborough and Allison retired it was David Pearson's show.

Notable crew chiefs in the race were Tim Brew, Jake Elder, Travis Carter, Harry Hyde, Dale Inman, Tom Vandiver, and Bud Moore.

Vic Parsons scored his best NASCAR finish in seventh place. Gordon Johncock, fresh from his Indy 500 win, finished 4th at this race.

The winner of the race won $16,100 ($ when considering inflation) while the last-place winner received $1,270 ($ when considering inflation). All the prize winnings from this race were $105,080 ($ when considering inflation).

Qualifying

Finishing order

 David Pearson
 Richard Petty
 Buddy Baker
 Gordon Johncock
 Benny Parsons
 Dave Marcis
 Vic Parsons
 Marty Robbins
 Dick Brooks
 Joe Frasson
 David Sisco
 James Hylton
 Cecil Gordon
 G.C. Spencer
 Roy Mayne
 Elmo Langley
 Dean Dalton
 Buddy Arrington
 Frank Warren
 Lennie Pond
 Larry Smith
 Raymond Williams
 Henley Gray
 Bill Champion
 Darrell Waltrip
 Walter Ballard
 Richard Childress
 Donnie Allison
 Ed Negre
 Bobby Allison
 Jabe Thomas
 Jim Vandiver
 John Sears
 Ed Sczech
 Dick Simon
 Cale Yarborough
 A. J. Foyt
 Coo Coo Marlin
 Bobby Isaac
 J.D. McDuffie

Timeline
Section reference: 
 Start: David Pearson officially had the lead position as the green flag was waved, Bobby Allison took over the lead prior to the end of the first lap, Bobby Isaac took over the lead from Bobby Allison.
 Lap 2: J.D. McDuffie fell out with engine failure.
 Lap 4: Bobby Allison took over the lead from Bobby Isaac.
 Lap 5: Cale Yarborough took over the lead from Bobby Isaac.
 Lap 8: Bobby Allison took over the lead from Cale Yarborough.
 Lap 9: Cale Yarborough took over the lead from Bobby Allison.
 Lap 11: Bobby Allison took over the lead from Cale Yarborough.
 Lap 13: Bobby Isaac fell out with engine failure.
 Lap 14: Cale Yarborough took over the lead from Bobby Allison.
 Lap 35: Coo Coo Marlin fell out with engine failure, David Pearson took over the lead from Cale Yarborough.
 Lap 36: Bobby Alliston took over the lead from David Pearson.
 Lap 37: Cale Yarborough took over the lead from Bobby Allison.
 Lap 42: Bobby Allison took over the lead from Cale Yarborough.
 Lap 45: Cale Yarborough took over the lead from Bobby Allison.
 Lap 46: A.J. Foyt managed to lose the rear end of his vehicle.
 Lap 47: Bobby Allison took over the lead from Cale Yarborough.
 Lap 65: Cale Yarborough had a terminal crash.
 Lap 66: David Pearson took over the lead from Bobby Allison.
 Lap 79: Richard Petty took over the lead from David Pearson.
 Lap 82: Dick Simon could not handle his vehicle in a proper manner.
 Lap 83: Bobby Allison took over the lead from Richard Petty.
 Lap 87: An oil leak forced Ed Sczech out of the race.
 Lap 96: Richard Petty took over the lead from Bobby Allison.
 Lap 100: David Pearson took over the lead from Richard Petty.
 Lap 102: John Sears fell out with engine failure, Bobby Allison took over the lead from David Pearson.
 Lap 105: Richard Petty took over the lead from Bobby Allison.
 Lap 110: David Pearson took over the lead from Richard Petty.
 Lap 116: Richard Petty took over the lead from David Pearson.
 Lap 118: Jim Vandiver managed to overheat his vehicle.
 Lap 125: Bobby Allison fell out with engine failure.
 Lap 129: David Pearson took over the lead from Richard Petty.
 Lap 131: Donnie Allison's windshield was severely damaged.
 Lap 132: Richard Childress managed to overheat his vehicle.
 Lap 138: Richard Petty took over the lead from David Pearson.
 Lap 141: David Pearson took over the lead from Richard Petty.
 Finish: David Pearson was officially declared the winner of the event.

References

Medal of Honor Firecracker
Medal of Honor Firecracker 400
NASCAR races at Daytona International Speedway